Sir John Pakington, 2nd Baronet (13 August 1621 – 1680) of Westwood House, near Droitwich, Worcestershire was an English politician who sat in the House of Commons  at various times between 1640 and 1679. He supported the Royalist cause in the English Civil War.

Biography

He was the son of Sir John Pakington, 1st Baronet and his wife Frances Ferrers, the daughter of Sir John Ferrers of Tamworth. His father and grandfather died when he was very young and he became the ward of Thomas Coventry, later Lord Coventry. He succeeded his father to the baronetcy in 1624 and his grandfather to his Westwood estate in 1625.

In April 1640, Pakington was elected Member of Parliament for Worcestershire in the Short Parliament. He was elected MP for Aylesbury for the Long Parliament in November 1640. He was disabled from sitting on 20 August 1642 for executing a commission of array for Charles I.  He served the King during the English Civil War but was captured and imprisoned in the Tower of London.  He appeared at the muster before the Battle of Worcester, and was in consequence tried for treason, but no one would testify against him, probably because he had been captured by the Scots.  He was nevertheless fined again.

After the Restoration Pakington was again a Justice of the Peace. In 1661, he was re-elected MP for Worcestershire in the Cavalier Parliament and sat until 1679.  He was instrumental in opposing an alleged plot by Andrew Yarranton and other Presbyterians, though they claimed (apparently successfully) that the plot was fabricated.

Pakington died at the age of 58.

Family
Pakington married  Dorothy Coventry, daughter of his guardian Lord Coventry, with whom he had one son and two daughters. He was succeeded by his son Sir John Pakington, 3rd Baronet

References

 

1621 births
1680 deaths
Baronets in the Baronetage of England
Cavaliers
Prisoners in the Tower of London
English MPs 1640 (April)
English MPs 1640–1648
English MPs 1661–1679
Members of the Parliament of England for Worcestershire